Joseph Anderson (born September 14, 1959) is a retired lieutenant general in the United States Army, who last served as Deputy Chief of Staff of the Army, G-3/5/7, previously serving as the commanding general of the XVIII Airborne Corps, Commander of International Security Assistance Force Joint Command and Deputy Commanding General, US Forces – Afghanistan. Born in New York in 1959, he was commissioned upon his graduation from the United States Military Academy in 1981.

Awards and decorations

References

1959 births
United States Army personnel of the Iraq War
United States Army personnel of the War in Afghanistan (2001–2021)
Central Michigan University alumni
Living people
Naval War College alumni
Recipients of the Defense Distinguished Service Medal
Recipients of the Defense Superior Service Medal
Recipients of the Distinguished Service Medal (US Army)
Recipients of the Legion of Merit
United States Army generals
United States Military Academy alumni